Baroness Maria Antonietta Avanzo (5 February 1889 – 17 January 1977) was the first Italian female racetrack driver and "the most famous Italian woman racing driver of the inter-war period". She competed in numerous events throughout her career, including racing the Mille Miglia five times. In 1921, she famously drove a twelve-cylinder Packard 299 on the beach of the island of Fanø, in Denmark. She married her husband Baron Eustachio Avanzo in 1908 with whom she had two children, Luisa in 1909 and Renzo in 1911. In her career she fought for the right to compete as a woman, and became an activist for equality for women and a symbol of early feminism.

Early life
Maria Antonietta Avanzo (née Bellan) was born in 1889 at Contarina, now Porto Viro, near Rovigo and learned to drive on her father's De Dion-Bouton tricycle. Before the Great War she married Baron Eustachio Avanzo, with whom she later had two children, and they moved to Rome. Both her father and her husband encouraged her driving talents, and Eustachio bought her a 35 hp SPA sportscar to race. In 1920 she began her racing career at the wheel of the SPA 35/50 in the Giro del Lazio.

Career

The first big race of Avanzo's career was the 1920 Giro del Lazio. She won her class, despite having to replace an errant wheel during the event. In 1920, she entered the Targa Florio in a Buick, but she did not finish and had to retire during her third lap. 1921 was an eventful year for Avanzo. She won the women's cup at the Brescia "Motor Sport Week", and in July she was driving a twelve-cylinder Packard which she took to a sand race meeting on the beaches of the island of Fanø, in Denmark, when the car caught fire while travelling at full speed, and she had to drive it into the sea to quench the flames. A young Enzo Ferrari was very impressed with her. According to Ferrari, as she emerged, Antonio Ascari overheard her remark that she'd be happy to swap it for a Fiat. On her return home she found a bright red Fiat awaiting her, and Ascari got the Packard which was repaired and put back into use. 
1921, driving an Ansaldo 4CS she was Tazio Nuvolari's teammate and came in 7th (3rd in class) at the Circuito di Garda.

Avanzo then emigrated to Australia, setting up a farming business there. She returned to Europe in 1926. In the 1930s she drove Alfa Romeos, Maseratis, and Bugattis on racetracks, in the Rocca di Papa hill climb, in the Mille Miglia, at Le Mans, at Indianapolis in a Miller in 1932, and even in the Tobruk-Tripoli in 1940. She had numerous rivals: Jole Venturi (OM),  Corinna Braccialini (Alfa 1500), Anna Maria Peduzzi, and Dorina Colonna. She took part in the Mille Miglia race at least five times. Her first attempt at the Mille Miglia was in 1928, driving a Chrysler Tipo 72 with Manuel de Teffé. They did not finish after a mechanical failure. The following year, she and Carlo Bruno retired early on, driving an Alfa Romeo 6C 1750 SS. After a break in 1930, she made another attempt at the Mille Miglia, in a Bugatti T43, driving with Count Carlo Castelbarco, and her final attempt was in 1932. She came in 6th at the Tobruk-Tripoli competition 1939. and her last recorded race was the 1939 Tobruk-Tripoli race, driving a Fiat. She was sixth in the 1100cc class, ahead of the other Italian female competitor, Lia Comirato Dumas. In 1940 she signed up entrant for the Mille Miglia, driving a Fiat 1100 with Angelo Della Cella, but did not start the race. Avanzo then retired.

See also
INDOMITA, la straordinaria vita di Maria Antonietta Avanzo (INDOMITE, the extraordinary life of Maria Antonietta Avanzo)'' by Luca Malin (2013)

References

1889 births
1977 deaths
Italian racing drivers
Italian motorsport people
Mille Miglia drivers
Italian female racing drivers
19th-century Italian women
20th-century Italian women